Act I is the debut studio album by the American progressive bluegrass band the Seldom Scene, released in 1972. It is regarded one of the best and most influential albums ever recorded in the genre.

Track listing
 "Raised By The Railroad Line" (Paul Craft) 2:59
 "Darling Corey" (Traditional); arranged by John Duffey) 3:43
 "Want of a Woman" (Paul Craft) 2:16
 "Sweet Baby James" (James Taylor) 3:09
 "Joshua" (Traditional; arranged by Mike Auldridge) 2:41
 "Will There Be Any Stars in My Crown?" (Traditional; arranged by John Duffey) 3:11
 "City of New Orleans" (Steve Goodman) 3:02
 "With Body and Soul" (Virginia Stauffer) 3:57
 "Summertime Is Past and Gone" (Bill Monroe) 2:13
 "500 Miles" (Hedy West) 3:21
 "Cannonball" (Traditional; arranged by Mike Auldridge) 2:44
 "What Am I Doing Hanging 'Round?" (Michael Martin Murphey) 2:53

Personnel
The Seldom Scene
 John Starling – vocals, guitar
 John Duffey – mandolin, vocals
 Ben Eldridge – banjo, guitar, vocals
 Mike Auldridge – Dobro, guitar, vocals
 Tom Gray – bass, vocals
Technical
 Roy Homer - engineer
 Ronnie Bucke - cover photography

References

External links
 Official site

The Seldom Scene albums
1972 debut albums
Rebel Records albums